Son of God is the second studio album by American rapper Young Noble. It was released on November 12, 2012, through Outlaw Recordz.

Background 
After the release of the last Outlawz album Perfect Timing in 2011, Young Noble released two mixtapes Outlaw Rydahz Vol. 1 and Outlaw Nation before the release of this album.

Singles 
The album's self-titled single "Son of God" Produced by Boss DeVito was released on iTunes Store on August 28, 2012.

In commemoration of the passing and in honor of Tupac, Young Noble released a music video for the song, “Son of God” directed by Jae Synth on September 13, the day Tupac died.

Track listing

References

External links 
 OutlawzMedia.net Official Website
 
 
 
 
 
 
 
 
 
 
 

2012 albums
Young Noble albums